The  is a Bo-Bo-Bo wheel arrangement multi-voltage AC/DC electric locomotive type operated by JR Freight and East Japan Railway Company (JR East) in Japan since 2002. , the fleet consists of 40 locomotives (24 EF510-0s and 16 EF510-500s), all based at Toyama Depot.

Design
The design used many components common with the Class EF210, and was intended to replace ageing Class EF81 locomotives on freight services operating along the Sea of Japan coastal routes.

Variants
 EF510-0: Locomotives EF510-1 – built from 2001 for JR Freight
 EF510-500: Locomotives EF510-501 – 515, built 2009–2010 originally for JR East
EF510-300: Locomotives EF510-301 onwards, built from 2021 for JR Freight
The class is subdivided into the original EF510-0 sub-class operated by JR Freight and fifteen EF510-500 sub-class locomotives ordered and originally operated on passenger services by JR East. As of 1 October 2013, there were 23 EF510-0 locomotives and 15 EF510-500 locomotives in service.

Class EF510-0
The first locomotive, EF510-1, was delivered in February 2002 and initially based at Shin-Tsurumi Depot before being transferred to Toyama Depot in 2002. The first full-production locomotive, EF510-2, was delivered in November 2003, and this and subsequent locomotives delivered featured "Red Thunder" bodyside branding.

Class EF510-500

The EF510-500 subclass consists of 15 locomotives originally operated by East Japan Railway Company (JR East), which replaced its fleet of EF81 locomotives formerly used to haul Cassiopeia and Hokutosei overnight sleeping car trains from June 2010.

These were the first locomotives to be ordered by any of the JR passenger operating companies since privatization. The new locomotives cost around 400 million yen each. The first locomotive, EF510-501, was delivered from the Kawasaki Heavy Industries factory in Hyogo Prefecture on 18 December 2009, arriving at Tabata Depot in Tokyo on 19 December. Livery was blue with gold lining and shooting star logo.

Two of the fifteen locomotives (EF510-509 and EF510-510) were painted in a dedicated colour scheme of silver with blue, purple, red, orange, and yellow stripes, to match the Cassiopeia rolling stock.

The first locomotive, EF510-501, entered service on 25 June 2010.

From the start of the revised timetable in March 2013, Joban Line freight duties operated by JR East EF510-500 locomotives were operated instead by JR Freight Class EH500 locomotives, and locomotive numbers EF510-501 to 508 and 511 became surplus to requirements. These nine locomotives were subsequently sold to JR Freight in July 2013. Locomotives EF510-512, 513, and 515 were also transferred to JR Freight in December 2015.

Build details
The delivery dates and liveries for the Class EF510-500 fleet are as follows.

Class EF510-300 
The EF510-300 subclass will consist of 17 locomotives expected to be introduced by JR Freight from March 2023 in the Kyushu area of Japan.

As part of its business plan for fiscal 2021, JR Freight announced on 31 March 2021 that they would procure Class EF510 locomotives to replace ageing locomotives, such as the Class ED76 and Class EF81, currently in use in Kyushu. On 15 October of the same year, it was revealed that the subclass would inherit the nickname , and the first production example of the subclass (EF510-301) was completed. EF510-301 was unveiled to the press on 9 December 2021.

Classification

The EF510 classification for this locomotive type is explained below.
 E: Electric locomotive
 F: Six driving axles
 510: AC/DC locomotive with AC motors

References

External links

 Profile on Kawasaki Heavy Industries website 

1500 V DC locomotives
20 kV AC locomotives
Electric locomotives of Japan
EF510
EF510
Bo-Bo-Bo locomotives
1067 mm gauge locomotives of Japan
Kawasaki locomotives
Railway locomotives introduced in 2002
Multi-system locomotives